Ampler Development Team is an Estonian-registered UCI Continental road cycling team founded in 2020. It was called Tartu2024–BalticChainCycling.com in its first year, and was renamed as Ampler Development Team for 2021.

Team roster

Major results
2020
Stage 2 Baltic Chain Tour, Rait Ärm
 National Time Trial Championship, Gleb Karpenko
 National Time Trial Championships, Ukko Peltonen
 National Road Race Championships, Antti-Jussi Juntunen
2021
 National Under-23 Road Race Championships, Aivaras Mikutis
 National Under-23 Road Race Championships, Pauls Rubenis
Stage 4 Dookoła Mazowsza, Antti-Jussi Juntunen

National champions
2020
  Estonian Time Trial, Gleb Karpenko
  Finnish Time Trial, Ukko Peltonen
  Finnish Road Race Trial, Antti-Jussi Juntunen
2021
  Lithuanian U23 Road Race, Aivaras Mikutis
  Latvian U23 Road Race, Pauls Rubenis
2022
  Finnish Time Trial, Markus Knaapi
  Finnish U23 Time Trial, Markus Knaapi
  Latvian Road Race, Alekss Krasts
  Lithuanian U23 Road Race, Aivaras Mikutis

References

External links

Cycling teams based in Estonia
Cycling teams established in 2020
UCI Continental Teams (Europe)